The Afghanka (proper designation: M88) is a type of military uniform system developed and issued by the Soviet Army in the early 1980s, still in use today in some Post-Soviet states in many different variants. The name Afghanka is an unofficial popular slang term in Russian for the uniform, derived from its prolific use during the Soviet–Afghan War. All the non-sand coloured versions of the M88 are not called Afghanka.

They are typically made of cotton ( or "Х/б", "cotton paper").

Design details
The Afghanka field uniform is made in a lightweight summer and heavier, lined winter version; both consist of a long, loose fitting 6-pocket BDU-style jacket with large stand-and-fall collar, epaulettes, concealed buttons, armpit vents, and tube-style field trousers with cargo pouches on the thighs. A field cap made from sturdier cotton and featuring ear flaps which could be unbuttoned and lowered to protect the ears was supplied with the uniform.

The winter model is composed of: jacket, jacket liner, trousers, plus insulated liners and suspenders. The liners are buttoned into their respective garments, and the outer garment can be worn without the liners. The jacket liner bears the fur collar of the jacket, usually in fish fur but occasionally in real fur (officer's uniforms). The jacket and trousers are lined with a pile-type material that helps insulate by trapping warm air, whereas the liners are made of a quilted material similar to the Telogreika uniform.

Colouring
Both uniforms were originally made in a khaki-coloured material, but later types were developed in olive drab, tan, and sage green, allegedly intended for use in different environmental theatres of operation.

Since the fall of the Soviet Union, the Afghanka has been copied and issued widely by CIS members in various localized camouflage patterns.

Operational history

The Afghanka began appearing in military units in the early 1980s during the Soviet–Afghan War, hence the name. The design of the jacket and trousers may have been based on similar patterns used by other Warsaw Pact armies such as the Nationale Volksarmee of the GDR. Initially only used in Afghanistan, the Afghanka uniform was in very short supply and was often issued to units rather than individuals and passed around as necessary for various duties. By the end of the 1980s, it had become possible for every soldier to be issued their own. Individual soldiers began marking the collars of their uniforms with bleach. In 1988 the uniform was adopted as standard issue, replacing the ageing M69/73 Uniform in all theaters.

The soldiers found the new uniform to be very effective, especially in Afghanistan. Even without the liners in, a winter Afghanka is comfortably warm in temperatures of down to −20 °C. Another advantage of the winter Afghanka over the preceding Bushlat and Shinel greatcoat was the greatly enhanced mobility and increased number of pockets.

Variants
The Afghanka was initially issued to regular units of the armed forces in a khaki colour. The uniform was also standardized with the KGB Border Troops, but in the service's unique "birch" camouflage pattern (similar to that used on the KLMK camouflage coverall) as well as Soviet Marines, who were the first to be issued with the newest Soviet camouflage development of the time—the woodland-style three-coloured Butane pattern (also known informally as TTsKO).

Although derived from a previous chemical-warfare uniform known as OKZK-D, the camouflage uniform made for VDV paratroopers in 1984 included many features from the Afghanka. Since then, various other uniforms evolved from the Afghanka in various camouflage patterns—such as VSR (the standard field uniform of the Russian Armed Forces since 1993, and later flora camouflage (issued since 1998), and many others. Belarus, Kazakhstan and Ukraine both currently issue Afghanka-cut uniforms in their own camouflage patterns.

The Soviet and Russian VDV model, made in either khaki, Butane, or VSR, lacked the lower patch pockets on the jacket as the blouse was intended to be worn tucked inside the trousers, to better accommodate the numerous harnesses used with a parachute. Both the USSR and the Russian Federation have also produced the uniform in plain colours for paramilitary use.

Users

Former users

See also
 Panamanka
 Kepka-afganka
 Valenki
 Podvorotnichok

Notes

Sources
 Soviet Uniforms and Militaria 1917–1991 by Laszlo Bekesi The Crowood Press UK (June 30, 2011), 
 Inside the Soviet Army Today. Osprey Elite Military History Series No. 12 by Stephen J Zaloga
 Russia's War in Afghanistan by David Isby
 Warsaw Pact Ground Forces by David Rottmman

External links

Military equipment introduced in the 1980s
Soviet military uniforms
Soviet–Afghan War